Nintendo Switch Online (NSO) is an online subscription service for the Nintendo Switch video game console. The service is Nintendo's third generation online service after Nintendo Wi-Fi Connection and Nintendo Network.  Following an interim period where Nintendo offered online multiplayer free of charge, the subscription service officially launched on September 18, 2018.

Nintendo Switch Online features include online multiplayer, cloud saving, voice chat via a smartphone app, access to special profile pictures, as well as other promotions and offers.  Also included is access to a library of Nintendo Entertainment System (NES), Super Nintendo Entertainment System (SNES), and Game Boy (GB) games.

An expanded tier of the service, Nintendo Switch Online + Expansion Pack, was released on October 25, 2021, and currently includes Nintendo 64 (N64), Sega Genesis, and Game Boy Advance (GBA) games in its library.  This tier also includes access to paid DLC for Animal Crossing: New Horizons, Mario Kart 8 Deluxe, and Splatoon 2.

History 
The Nintendo Switch was announced in October 2016 and released on March 3, 2017. Nintendo stated in its pre-release announcements that the system would eventually require the purchase of a paid "online service" but that they would be available to all users at no charge until the service launched. Features announced included a companion smartphone app, as well as access to a free Nintendo Entertainment System game per month. The service was initially planned for late 2017.

Then-Nintendo of America president Reggie Fils-Aimé explained that the delays were to ensure that the service was "world-class", and had enough of its announced functionality available on-launch to justify its cost. Nintendo aimed for a lower price point in comparison to PlayStation Plus and Xbox Live Gold, as the service does not include the same range of features as these subscription services provide. Then-Nintendo president Tatsumi Kimishima stated that the price point was a subject of importance in designing the Switch's online services, and that regardless of what competitors were doing, "it's a matter of getting our content to the consumer at a price point that would make them happy, and then we're willing to look at what else we can do going forward." The Nintendo Switch Online service was launched on September 18, 2018. A Nintendo Direct five days before the release detailed the full set of features that would be part of the Online service, including a larger and persistent library of NES games with 20 available on launch, and more to be added on an ongoing basis, as well as cloud save support. The initial launch covered 43 markets, with more markets expected to follow later.

In September 2018, Nintendo Switch consoles imported to China started experiencing connectivity issues there, due to the Nintendo Switch Online service using Google's servers, which are blocked in China. The service officially launched in South Korea and Hong Kong, on April 23, 2019.

On September 5, 2019, Super NES games were added to the service under a separate app. On December 1, 2020, the 11.0.0 software update for the Nintendo Switch system software was released, which added a Nintendo Switch Online app to the console's home screen.

Nintendo introduced a new subscription tier known as Nintendo Switch Online + Expansion Pack on October 26, 2021; this tier primarily adds Nintendo 64 and Sega Genesis titles to the classic games service. It also adds Animal Crossing: New Horizons: Happy Home Paradise for the duration of the subscription. Nintendo 64 games on the service are based on their NTSC versions running at 60 Hz with English language options and select games have the option to play the original PAL version with alternate language options.

In February 2023, Nintendo added Game Boy and Game Boy Advance titles to the service. The standard subscription gave access to the Game Boy titles, while Game Boy Advance titles required the Expansion Pack tier.

Usage
By December 31, 2018, approximately three months after its launch, the service had gained more than eight million subscribers. Nintendo reported in late-April 2019 that the service had 9.8 million subscribers. The service reached over 10 million subscribers by July 2019, and over 15 million by January 2020. The service had reached over 26 million members by September 2020. By September 2021, the service had reached 32 million subscribers.

In May 2022, Nintendo President Shuntaro Furukawa claimed in an interview that subscribers of the paid service had "gradually" increased. Adding that a large percentage of the new members were in the United States.

Features

Multiplayer 
Nintendo Switch Online is required to access online multiplayer on the majority of titles. Some free-to-play multiplayer games, such as Fortnite Battle Royale and Warframe, and games published in China (due to the Chinese version of Nintendo Switch lacking Nintendo Switch Online service), are exempt from this requirement, and can be played online freely without a subscription.

Cloud saves 
Cloud storage allows save data for supported games to be synchronized online, so it can be recovered if the user must move their Nintendo Account to a different Switch console or if they use multiple consoles. The feature is not supported for some games including those with certain forms of online functionality such as item trading and competitive rankings, citing concerns surrounding the possibility of abuse that could "unfairly affect" gameplay.

Users will lose access to their cloud saves should they allow their subscription to lapse, though there is a grace period of six months to renew the subscription and recover them before they are purged.

According to the list below, there are currently  games which do not support cloud save functionality.

Companion app 
The Nintendo Switch Online Smartphone App is a console companion application developed and published by Nintendo for use alongside the Nintendo Switch Online service. Released on July 21, 2017 for use on iOS and Android devices. The app features voice chat and "game-specific services" for games such as Splatoon 2, Mario Kart 8 Deluxe, Arms, Mario Tennis Aces, Nintendo Entertainment System for Nintendo Switch Online, Super Smash Bros. Ultimate, and Animal Crossing: New Horizons.

Communication 
Users can voice chat through the Nintendo Switch Online mobile app on smartphones. Voice chat functionality is not available natively through the Switch console;  Reggie Fils-Aimé justified the decision by explaining that "Nintendo's approach is to do things differently. We have a much different suite of experiences than our competitors offer, and we do that in a different way. This creates a sort of yin and yang for our consumers. They're excited about cloud saves and legacy content but wish we might deliver voice chat a different way, for example."

Legacy games service 

Since the Wii era, Nintendo typically offered games from their older consoles through the Virtual Console service, using first-party emulators to run the games on their newer consoles; however, they would not use the Virtual Console brand for the Nintendo Switch family. Instead, Switch Online subscribers can access apps to play games for antecedent video game systems, with the emulation software being developed by NERD. Games with multiplayer modes support both local and online play. During its first year, the Online service distributed Nintendo Entertainment System (NES) games, and later added Super Nintendo Entertainment System (SNES) titles in September 2019. Nintendo has expanded both libraries over time. Starting in October 2021, subscribers can purchase an expansion to play Nintendo 64 and Sega Genesis games. In February 2023, games for the Game Boy/Game Boy Color were added to the base Nintendo Switch Online subscription, while games for the Game Boy Advance were made available for those who purchase the Expansion Pack. In certain cases, some of these games have been reworked to support multiplayer gameplay for up to four players locally and online.

Offers and promotions 
Switch Online subscribers are also granted access to special offers and promotions from Nintendo; on launch, those who purchased a 12-month subscription or family plan received special in-game items for Splatoon 2, and Nintendo opened exclusive pre-orders for special wireless controllers based on the NES controller, specifically intended for use with the aforementioned NES app. Similarly, a special wireless SNES-based controller designed to work with the Switch was made available to purchase exclusively to Online subscribers shortly after the service added support for SNES titles. Ahead of the October 2021 expansion pack to support Nintendo 64 and Sega Genesis games, Nintendo announced the availability of two Switch controllers available to Online subscribers based on the Nintendo 64 and the three-button Genesis controller form factors, while a controller based on the six-button Mega Drive controller will be available to Japan subscribers. Controllers based on the Famicom and Super Famicom were also released for their respective companion apps in Japan.

Coinciding with the anticipated release of Super Mario Maker 2, a price-reduction promotion was announced during the game's Nintendo Direct that was available exclusively to Nintendo Switch Online members. The promotion introduced "Nintendo Switch Game Vouchers", which allows purchasers to download two qualifying Nintendo Switch games for a set price of $99.99 MSRP, compared to a $120 sum of buying both games separately.

Nintendo has also offered free original games for those with an Online subscription. Tetris 99 was released as a free-to-play title for subscribers in February 2019, though has subsequently offered paid downloadable content and retail versions of the game for non-subscribers. Super Mario Bros. 35 was released on October 1, 2020, and was only available through March 31, 2021. Pac-Man 99 was released as a free to play title for subscribers in April 2021 with paid downloadable content available. Upon the release of the Expansion Pack tier, the Animal Crossing: New Horizons DLC "Happy Home Paradise" was also made available via the service. The Expansion Pack tier also includes Mario Kart 8 Deluxe's Booster Course Pass, and Splatoon 2's Octo Expansion DLC.

Missions and rewards
Missions and rewards were launched in March 2022. These missions, to be offered on a rotating basis, give the user opportunities to earn Nintendo platinum points by completing certain activities with the Switch software or in various games. The points can then be redeemed to purchase digital items to be used within the Nintendo Switch app, as well as towards physical items at the Nintendo store.

Game Trials 
Game Trials are a feature that allow members to try out a game for 1 week. The game would be the same as if a person were to buy the game regularly. Games that are on Game Trials usually also go on sale on the eShop. If subscribers bought the game, any progress made on the trial will transfer to the game.

Reception 

Reviews for the service have been mostly mixed. Its affordable price compared to other online services has been generally praised, but its smartphone app, NES and SNES content library, the initially small selection of cloud save-supported games, and lack of dedicated servers have been criticized.

During the Nintendo Direct on September 23, 2021, the addition of Nintendo 64 and Sega Genesis games for Nintendo Switch Online, exclusive to an Expansion Pack, was revealed. During the Animal Crossing New Horizons Direct on October 15, 2021, the price of the Expansion Pack was revealed, drawing widespread criticism. The same day, Nintendo uploaded a trailer to YouTube detailing the Expansion Pack, which was received negatively, with about 120,000 dislikes as of November 1, 2021, becoming the most disliked video on the channel. The Nintendo 64 games emulated via the Expansion Pack were found to have several performance issues, including input lag and frame rate issues. The fixed remapping of controls designed for the six-button Nintendo 64 controller to the four-button Switch Joy-Con also affected games like Sin & Punishment. Multiplayer games like Mario Kart 64 also appeared to use netcode that Nintendo had previously used in prior Virtual Console releases which forced the game to pause for other players until all players were synchronized. The games also did not support a virtual equivalent of the Controller Pak memory expansion, preventing players from utilizing ghost data in Mario Kart 64 or the native method of saving in WinBack. Informal tests found that the Nintendo Switch Online version of selected Nintendo 64 games performed worse than compared to the same games available on the Wii U's Virtual Console.

In its quarterly report to investors given in November 2021, Nintendo stated that they plan "to improve and expand both Nintendo Switch Online and Nintendo Switch Online + Expansion Pack striving to provide services that satisfy consumers."

See also
 Arcade Archives
 Sega Ages

References

External links
 

2018 introductions
Nintendo 64 emulators
Nintendo Entertainment System emulators
Nintendo services
Nintendo Switch
Online video game services
Sega Genesis emulators
Subscription video game services
Super Nintendo Entertainment System emulators
Video game platform emulators
Game Boy emulators
Game Boy Advance emulators